ESHS may refer to:
 ES Hammam-Sousse, a Tunisian football club

Schools 
 El Segundo High School, El Segundo, California, United States
 Elmore Stoutt High School, Tortola, British Virgin Islands
 Emma Sansom High School, Gadsden, Alabama, United States
 Esperance Senior High School, Esperance, Western Australia, Australia

See also 
 Esh (disambiguation)